Tenno Station is the name of two train stations in Japan:

 Tennō Station (Akita) (天王駅)
 Tennō Station (Hiroshima) (天応駅)

See also
 Tenino station, Washington, U.S.A.